Rudolf ("Ruud" or "Rudi") Jozef Krol (born 24 March 1949) is a Dutch former professional footballer who was capped 83 times for the Netherlands national team. Most of his career he played for his home town club, Ajax, and he became a coach after retirement. Regarded as one of the best defenders of all time, Krol mainly played as a sweeper or left-back, however he could play anywhere across the back line, or in midfield as a defensive midfielder, due to his range of passing with both feet, temperament, tactical intelligence, and ability to start attacking plays after winning back the ball.

Playing career

Club
He began his career at Ajax under manager Rinus Michels. In his first season at the club he did not play much. After the departure of left-back Theo van Duivenbode in the summer of 1969 to Feyenoord, Krol became a regular player. When Ajax reached the UEFA European Cup in 1971, and won, Krol did not play because of a broken leg. Krol did play in the European Cup finals of 1972 and 1973.  While others such as Johan Cruijff and Johan Neeskens left for new pastures, Krol, captain since the departure of Piet Keizer in October 1974, stayed at Ajax until June 1980.

He moved to the North American Soccer League to play for the Vancouver Whitecaps for one season. He then joined S.S.C. Napoli where he played for the next four seasons. His last club before he retired in 1986 was the French club AS Cannes, at the time in Ligue 2 (the French 2nd division).

International

Internationally, Krol made his debut for the Netherlands in 1969 against England, retiring from international football in 1983. He was a crucial component in the Total Football side of the 1970s. A versatile defender, he could play in any position along the back four or midfield. In the 1974 FIFA World Cup, in which the Netherlands reached the final, Krol primarily played at left-back. He created Cruijff's goal against Brazil and scored a 25-yard screamer against Argentina.

By the time the 1978 FIFA World Cup came about, Krol had switched to playing as a sweeper and had earned the captain's armband after the retirement of Cruijff.

Krol played for the Netherlands as captain at the 1980 European Championship. He played for part of the qualifying  for Euro 84, and played his last international in 1983.

Managerial career

In his managerial career, he has been head coach of Egypt, and has been assistant manager of the Netherlands (under Frank Rijkaard and Louis van Gaal) and Ajax (under Ronald Koeman). He became interim manager of Ajax after the resignation of Koeman. He was manager of AC Ajaccio in France Ligue 2 from 2006 to 2007. He returned as manager of Egyptian giants Zamalek in August 2007. He had previously managed them from 1994 to 1999, winning the Egyptian Cup in 1999, the African Cup of Champions Clubs in 1996 and the Afro-Asian Club Championship 1997, the last two being the biggest club level prizes available to CAF clubs. Krol's return to Zamalek was meant to be a stabilizing presence, the club having gone through several managers in the preceding two seasons.
His stay however would be a short one. He ended his sole season by winning one Egyptian Cup with Zamalek, within one season he would leave and sign a three-year contract with the South African giants Orlando Pirates.

In the three years with the Orlando Pirates he won two South African cups (and a finalist once) and won the national league, all in his last year in charge of the team.
Those cups include MTN8 and Nedbank Cup. Despite that success his contract was not renewed.

He won the Tunisian championship with CS Sfaxien in 2012–2013, after a fierce battle with the other 3 of the Tunisian big 4. 
After that success, he was contacted to lead the Tunisian national team in the play off qualifying to the 2014 world cup against Cameroon. He accepted that role and simultaneously became manager of CS Sfaxien and Tunisia in September 2013.  
He won the 2013 CAF Confederation Cup with Sfaxien. 
He resigned from his duties as Sfaxien coach after the second leg of the final against TP Mazembe on 30 November 2013. He quit as the national team interim coach following Tunisia's loss in the World Cup play-off.

In January 2014, he was appointed new head coach of Tunisian side ES Tunis.

Personal life

On 6 July 1972, Krol married Yvonne van Ingen. The couple have a daughter. On 26 September 1974, together with teammate Arie Haan, he opened a snack bar on Reguliersbreestraat in Amsterdam.

Honours

Player
Ajax
 Eredivisie: 1969–70, 1971–72, 1972–73, 1976–77, 1978–79, 1979–80, 
 KNVB Cup: 1969–70, 1970–71, 1971–72, 1978–79
 European Cup: 1970–71, 1971–72, 1972–73
 UEFA Super Cup: 1972, 1973
 Intercontinental Cup: 1972

Netherlands
 FIFA World Cup runner-up: 1974, 1978
 UEFA Euro third place: 1976

Individual
 FIFA World Cup All-Star Team: 1974, 1978
 UEFA Euro Team of the Tournament: 1976
 FIFA XI: 1979
 Ballon d'Or – third place: 1979
 Guerin d'Oro (Serie A Footballer of the Year): 1981

Coach
Ajaccio
 Ligue 2 third place: 2007

Zamalek
 Afro-Asian Club Championship: 1997
 Egyptian Premier League: runner-up 1998, 2008
 Egypt Cup: 2008

Orlando Pirates
 Premier Soccer League: 2011; runner-up 2009
 Nedbank Cup: 2011; runner-up 2010
 Telkom charity cup: 2010, 2011                                          
 MTN 8: 2010

CS Sfaxien
 Tunisian Ligue Professionnelle 1: 2013
 CAF Confederation Cup: 2013
 Tunisian Cup: runner-up 2012

Esperance
 Tunisian Ligue Professionnelle 1: 2014

Raja Casablanca
 UNAF Club Cup: 2015

Kuwait SC
 Kuwait Premier League: 2019–20

Egyptian Olympic Team (U23)
 All African Games: gold medal 1995

Egypt
 1996 African Cup of Nations: second round

Netherlands (assistant coach under Frank Rijkard)
 UEFA Euro 2000: semi-final

Individual
 PSL Coach of the Season: 2010–11

References

External links
 

1949 births
Living people
1974 FIFA World Cup players
1978 FIFA World Cup players
AC Ajaccio managers
AFC Ajax managers
AFC Ajax players
AS Cannes players
CS Sfaxien managers
Dutch expatriate footballers
Dutch expatriate sportspeople in Belgium
Dutch expatriate sportspeople in Canada
Dutch expatriate sportspeople in Egypt
Dutch expatriate sportspeople in France
Dutch expatriate sportspeople in Italy
Dutch expatriate sportspeople in Kuwait
Dutch expatriate sportspeople in South Africa
Dutch expatriate sportspeople in Switzerland
Dutch footballers
Dutch football managers
Egypt national football team managers
Eredivisie players
Expatriate footballers in France
Expatriate footballers in Italy
Expatriate soccer players in Canada
Association football defenders
Ligue 2 players
Netherlands international footballers
North American Soccer League (1968–1984) players
Orlando Pirates F.C. managers
Footballers from Amsterdam

S.S.C. Napoli players
Serie A players
AFC Ajax non-playing staff
Servette FC managers
Tunisia national football team managers
UEFA Euro 1976 players
UEFA Euro 1980 players
Vancouver Whitecaps (1974–1984) players
Kuwait SC managers
K.V. Mechelen managers
Zamalek SC managers
Espérance Sportive de Tunis managers
Dutch expatriate football managers
Expatriate football managers in Belgium
Expatriate football managers in Egypt
Expatriate football managers in France
Expatriate football managers in Kuwait
Expatriate soccer managers in South Africa
Expatriate football managers in Switzerland
Expatriate football managers in Tunisia
Raja CA managers
Kuwait Premier League managers
1996 African Cup of Nations managers
UEFA Champions League winning players
Al Wahda FC managers
Al-Ahli SC (Tripoli) managers
UAE Pro League managers
Expatriate football managers in the United Arab Emirates
Dutch expatriate sportspeople in the United Arab Emirates
Botola managers
Dutch expatriate sportspeople in Morocco
Expatriate football managers in Morocco